The Nordic Indoor Athletics Championships was an international athletics competition between four Nordic countries – Finland, Sweden, Norway, and Denmark. It was held twice, in 1986 and 1987. A Nordic Indoor Match was contested in 2017.

Events
The competition programme featured a total of 22 individual Nordic Championship athletics events, 12 for men and 10 for women. Women did not compete in the pole vault or triple jump events, reflecting the Olympic programme of the time.

Running
60 metres, 200 metres, 400 metres, 800 metres, 1500 metres, 3000 metres
Obstacle events
60 metres hurdles
Jumping events
Pole vault (men only), high jump, long jump, triple jump (men only)
Throwing events
Shot put

Editions

References

 
Recurring sporting events established in 1986
Recurring sporting events disestablished in 1987
1986 establishments in Europe
1987 disestablishments in Europe
Defunct athletics competitions